Rodney Appiah is a Ghanaian professional footballer who plays as a midfielder for Ghanaian Premier League side Accra Great Olympics.

Career

Early career 
Appiah started his career at Ghana Division Two League outfit KingStep FC, a club founded by his father Stephen Appiah and compatriot Laryea Kingston.

Great Olympics 
In February 2021, there were rumours that Appiah and Jacob Kingston, the son of Ghanaian international footballer Laryea Kingston were on the verge of joining Nungua-based team Accra Great Olympics. The duo joined the team in March 2021, during the second transfer period ahead of the second round of the 2020–21 Ghana Premier League season. He made his debut on 2 May 2021, coming on in the 90th minute for Michael Otou to make a cameo appearance in a 2–0 win over Liberty Professionals.

Personal life 
He is the son of former Ghanaian football international and captain Stephen Appiah.

References

External links 

 

Living people
Association football midfielders
Ghanaian footballers
Accra Great Olympics F.C. players
Ghana Premier League players
Year of birth missing (living people)